Wendoree Park is a suburb of the Central Coast region of New South Wales, Australia, located on the north bank of the Hawkesbury River  and the east bank of Mangrove Creek north of Sydney. It is part of the  local government area.

The suburb was originally conceived as a "dream village" by Athol Leeming Spring when he purchased property there around the 1940s/1950s. He gave the site the name "Wendoree Park" and hoped to build a village there of 250 self-contained cottages, overlooking Spencer.

References

Suburbs of the Central Coast (New South Wales)